The German Civil Service Association (dbb beamtenbund und tarifunion) is a national trade union center in Germany. It has a membership of 1,250,000, and is affiliated with the European Confederation of Independent Trade Unions.

References

External links
dbb.de
 

Trade unions in Germany
European Confederation of Independent Trade Unions
1918 establishments in Germany
Organisations based in Berlin
Trade unions established in 1918